Kabler is a surname. Notable people with the surname include:

Carole Jo Kabler (1938–2017), American golfer
Jackie Kabler (born 1966), British television presenter
Roger Kabler, American actor

See also
Kibler (surname)